The Ashland Stakes is an American Thoroughbred horse race held annually in early April at Keeneland Race Course in Lexington, Kentucky, United States. It and the Ashland Oaks, the Kentucky Association racetrack's predecessor race, were named for Ashland, the homestead and breeding farm of statesman Henry Clay in Lexington, Kentucky. Restricted to three-year-olds fillies the race is currently run at a distance of one and one-sixteenth miles. The race is a Grade I event with a current purse of $500,000 and has been a prep race to the Triple Tiara of Thoroughbred Racing, including the Kentucky Oaks, the Black-Eyed Susan Stakes and Mother Goose Stakes.

Part of the 1936 inaugural events for the new Keeneland Race Course, the first two editions of the Ashland Stakes were open to fillies and mares, 3-years of age and older. Not run again until 1940, it was then made a race exclusively for 3-year-old fillies. During World War II, from 1943 through 1945 the race was hosted by Churchill Downs in Louisville.

The Ashland Stakes was run in two heats in 1952, 1965, 1974 and 1980. Don Brumfield is the only jockey to ever have won both heats. In the 1974 edition, Brumfield rode to victory on Winged Wishes, a horse owned by his mother, Viola, then took the second running aboard Darby Dan Farm's, Maud Muller.

Since its inception, the Ashland Stakes has been raced at various distances:
 1936–1937, 1981 to present :  miles
 1940–1973 : 6 furlongs
 1974–1980 : 7 furlongs, 184 feet

In 2014, the Ashland finished in a Dead heat between Rosalind and Room Service.

Records
Speed record at current distance
 1:41.26 –  miles set by Speech in 2020.

Most wins by an owner
 3 – Calumet Farm (1948, 1952, 1980) & Cain Hoy Stable (1957, 1959, 1963)

Most wins by a jockey
 3 – Bill Shoemaker (1964, 1981, 1982)
 3 – Don Brumfield (1974 (2), 1984)
 3 – Randy Romero (1980, 1985, 1990)
 3 – Shane Sellers (1991, 1993, 2000)

Most wins by a trainer
 4 – Woody Stephens (1949, 1957, 1959, 1963)

Winners of the Ashland Stakes since 1969

*1972 – Hempens Song Disqualified from first and placed eighth.

Earlier winners

1968 – Miss Swapsco 
1967 – Dun-Cee 
1966 – Justakiss 
1965 – Terentia 
1965 – Bright Bauble 
1964 – Blue Norther
1963 – Sally Ship 
1962 – Windy Miss
1961 – Goldflower 
1960 – Tingle
1959 – Hidden Talent
1958 – Ramadel
1957 – Jota Jota
1956 – Doubledogdare
1955 – Insouciant
1954 – Jenjay
1953 – Cerise Reine
1952 – Free For Me 
1952 – Real Delight
1951 – Sickle's Image
1950 – Wondring
1949 – Tall Weeds
1948 – Bewitch 
1947 – Cosmic Missile
1946 – Sweet Caprice
1945 – Come And Go 
1944 – Harriet Sue 
1943 – Valdina Marl
1942 – The Swallow
1941 – Valdina Myth
1940 – June Bee
1939 – No race
1938 – No race
1937 – Drowsy 
1936 – Myrtlewood

See also
Road to the Kentucky Oaks

References

Keeneland horse races
Flat horse races for three-year-old fillies
Grade 1 stakes races in the United States
Graded stakes races in the United States
Recurring sporting events established in 1936
1936 establishments in Kentucky